Charles "Charlie the Tuna" Chapman was an American distance swimmer specializing in the butterfly stroke.

Biography
Chapman was born in Buffalo, New York. In 1981, he became the first black swimmer to cross the English Channel.

In 1988, he earned a world record by circumnavigating the island of Manhattan, 28.5 miles, in 9 hours, 25 minutes and 8 seconds. The previous year, Los Angeles Dodgers vice president Al Campanis had stated that blacks couldn't swim because their bones were too heavy; Chapman, in response, said, "I'm like Jackie Robinson paving the way, except I'll be wearing a little bathing suit", and ""Silly stuff like that, some people believe. Hell, you watch me swim around Manhattan".

He went on to complete butterfly-only swims from Alcatraz to Aquatic Park in San Francisco, around Alcatraz Island, and, in 1997, completed the Manhattan Island Marathon Swim.

In 1993, Chapman was sentenced to two years and nine months in federal prison, the minimum under sentencing guidelines, for his part in conspiracy to sell five ounces of cocaine.

See also

List of successful English Channel swimmers

References

Living people
American male butterfly swimmers
American long-distance swimmers
Sportspeople from Buffalo, New York
American people convicted of drug offenses
Year of birth missing (living people)
Manhattan Island swimmers